German submarine U-854 was a Type IXC/40 U-boat built for Nazi Germany's Kriegsmarine during World War II.

Design
German Type IXC/40 submarines were slightly larger than the original Type IXCs. U-854 had a displacement of  when at the surface and  while submerged. She had two shafts and two  propellers.

U-854 was fitted with six  torpedo tubes (four fitted at the bow and two at the stern), 22 torpedoes, one  SK C/32 naval gun, 180 rounds, and a  SK C/30 as well as a  C/30 anti-aircraft gun. The boat had a complement of forty-eight.

Service history
U-854 was ordered on 5 June 1941 from DeSchiMAG AG Weser in Bremen under the yard number 1060. Her keel was laid down on 21 September 1942 and the U-boat was launched the following year on 5 April 1943. She was commissioned into service under the command of Kapitänleutnant Horst Weiher (Crew 36) in 4th U-boat Flotilla.

On 4 February 1944 the U-boat was on its way back to Swinemünde, when she struck a mine - one of a barrage 'Geranium', that had been laid by the British Royal Air Force. 51 crew members died, seven survived.

References

Bibliography

External links

World War II submarines of Germany
German Type IX submarines
1943 ships
U-boats commissioned in 1943
U-boats sunk in 1944
U-boats sunk by mines
Ships built in Bremen (state)
Maritime incidents in February 1944